The Carlyle station is a former railway station in Carlyle, Saskatchewan. It was built by the Canadian National Railway in 1909 and later served Via Rail. It now houses the Rusty Relics Museum.

Rusty Relics Museum
The Rusty Relics Museum was founded as a non-profit organisation in 1973 thanks to a Youth for Employment Grant from the government. Seven women went around Carlyle gathering artefacts and interviewing older residents to start the founding of the museum. Gladys Nicholl was elected its first president that same year. In 1976, the museum bought the old train station and had it moved to its present location. The museum officially opened on 8 July 1980.

The museum houses a working telegraph station, 10,000 catalogued artefacts, a Canadian Pacific Railway (CPR) caboose and jigger car on a railway track. As a separate building there is a country schoolhouse. There was Anglican Church that was built in 1905 as part of the museum, but it was demolished in 2019.

Gallery

References

Canadian National Railway stations in Saskatchewan
Canadian Northern Railway stations in Saskatchewan
Railway stations in Canada opened in 1909
Disused railway stations in Canada
Railway museums in Saskatchewan
1909 establishments in Saskatchewan